Wichan Nantasri (born January 15, 1986), or simply known as Brid, is a Thai professional footballer who plays as a winger for Thai League 3 club Muang Loei United.

Personal life

Wichan's twin younger brother Wicha is also a footballer.

Honours

Club
Loei City
 Regional League North-East Division (1): 2009

Muang Loei United
 Thai League 3 Northeastern Region (1): 2021–22

External links

1986 births
Living people
Wichan Nantasri
Wichan Nantasri
Association football midfielders
Wichan Nantasri
Wichan Nantasri
Wichan Nantasri
Wichan Nantasri
Wichan Nantasri
Wichan Nantasri
Twin sportspeople
Wichan Nantasri